World of Our Own is the third studio album recorded by Irish boy band Westlife. It was released through RCA Records on 12 November 2001. This is their third album release under RCA and Sony Music. It was also the band's third album to be released as a five-piece. It reached number one in the United Kingdom and includes the singles "Queen of My Heart" (which was a double A-side with "When You're Looking Like That"), "World of Our Own" (which was a double A-side with "Angel"), "Bop Bop Baby", and the final single from the group's last album, "Uptown Girl". "Evergreen" was later covered by Will Young as his winner's single for the 2002 Pop Idol competition. It is their first album to have a title track.

The album went 4× Platinum in the UK and is currently the fourteenth biggest selling boy band album ever in the UK. The album was one of the best selling international albums in Hong Kong in 2002. In January 2005, the album was re-released in a 2-in-1 box set with the group's previous album, Coast to Coast.

Background
In an interview with Westlife, Brian McFadden said that the third album is called World of Our Own. The idea for the title came from Shane Filan's idea, because it was one of the song the band recorded for the album with the same title. The album has a great variety of songs, from Latin to pop to rock. The band spent four months to make this album. They also wrote seven songs on this album. The album cover was shot in Dublin.

Songs
"Uptown Girl" was recorded by the band as a part of the 2001 Comic Relief charity single. It was released on 5 March 2001. "Queen of My Heart" was released on 5 November 2001 as the first single from this album. It was the band's decision to release it as the first single because they wanted to have a 'westlife' soul on the next single. Filan said that when the band heard it for the first time, they felt it was definitely gonna be the first single from the album. In an interview, Kian said that the song was about a person who wants to go back to their soulmate whom they have been away from each other for a long time. "World of Our Own" was released on 18 February 2002 as the second single from this album. The band described it as a real 'poppy' song. "Bop Bop Baby" was released on 20 May 2002 as the third single from this album.

The album also have "I Wanna Grow Old with You" track which was written by the band. It received over 100 million views in YouTube. It is the band's seventh most streamed song in the United Kingdom as of January 2019.

Bonus track "Bad Girls" was intended to be recorded by Luis Fonsi but the band loved the song and eventually recorded it. This is also the first track the band and the co-writer Savan Kotecha become connected.

World of Our Own Tour

The World of Our Own Tour saw Westlife touring the UK and Europe in 2002. The tour centered on a space theme with giant globes for the band's entrance.

Track listing

 "Queen of My Heart" is also referred to as "Team of My Heart" according to music repertoires.
 "World of Our Own" is also referred to as "A World of Our Own" according to music repertoires.
 "To Be Loved" is also referred to as "Release" and "Release Me" according to music repertoires.
 "Drive (for All Time)" is also referred to as "Drive", "Drive All Day", "Drive for All Time", "For All Time" according to music repertoires.

Credits

Release history

Charts

Weekly charts

Year-end charts

Certifications

References

External links

Official Westlife Website

2001 albums
Westlife albums
RCA Records albums
Sony BMG albums
Albums produced by Cutfather
Albums produced by Steve Mac
Albums produced by David Kreuger
Albums produced by Per Magnusson
Albums produced by Richard Stannard (songwriter)
Albums recorded at Cheiron Studios